Dena Westerfield, D.C. (born January 26, 1971) is an American IFBB professional female bodybuilder, chiropractic doctor, personal trainer and massage therapist. She lives in Chesterfield, a suburb of St. Louis, Missouri.

Early life and education
Dena Westerfield was born, and spent most of her life, in St. Petersburg, Florida. A seasoned athlete, she graduated with her pre-med degree from USF in 2000. Westerfield studied massage therapy at the Humanities Center (now called Cortiva Institute) in Pinellas Park, Florida.  She left Florida in 2000 to attend Life College of Chiropractic in Marietta, Georgia.

In 2002, she was a student at Logan College of Chiropractic in Chesterfield, Missouri. In 2004, she opened the Westerfield Health Center there.

Career
In 2005, Dena won her International Federation of BodyBuilding & Fitness (IFBB) pro card. She attended her first Ms. Olympia in 2006.

Contest history
 2000 Women’s Tri- Fitness - 3rd
 2001 NPC USA Coastal - 1st (overall and HW)
 2003 NPC USA MW - 7th
 2003 NPC Junior National - 1st (overall and MW)
 2004 NPC National - 4th (LHW)
 2005 NPC National - 1st (LHW)
 2006 IFBB Europa Super Show - 2nd
 2006 IFBB Ms. Olympia - 14th
 2007 IFBB Jan Tana Classic - 2nd
 2007 IFBB Europa Super Show - 4th
 2008 IFBB New York Pro - 4th
 2009 IFBB Ms. International - 9th
 2009 IFBB New York Pro - 5th
 2010 IFBB Phoenix Pro - 5th
 2010 IFBB Ms. International - 13th
 2011 IFBB Pro Bodybuilding Weekly Championships - 15th

References

External links
Official website

1971 births
American female bodybuilders
Living people
Professional bodybuilders
People from Chesterfield, Missouri
Logan University alumni
21st-century American women